Tahawar Ali (died 1854) was a noble man in the court of Bhonsle Dynasty at Nagpur.

Biography
Tahawar Ali (died on 13 Rabi' al-awwal 1271 AH / 1854 AD) lived his life with nobility. He was well off man from Nagpur. He was employed in the court of Bhonsle Dynasty at the princely state of Nagpur along with his maternal uncle Qazi Najibuddin. At that time, Maharaja Senasaheb Subha Chhatrapati Raghuji Bapusaheb Bhonsle III was the ruler of the princely state of Nagpur (1818–1853).

Last days of his life and death
During his illness, he came to Rewari from Nagpur along with the Taboot (caravan) of Bakshi Ghulam Haider ibn Mufti Noorul Haq. When his mother Amaratun Nisan from Tijara heard this news that he was coming in sick state from Nagpur to Rewari, she went to Rewari to receive him.  She herself became ill while staying in Rewari and died on Dhu al-Hijjah 1244 AH/ 1828 AD. Tahawar Ali passed his last days of his life in Tijara and finally died on 13 Rabi' al-awwal 1271 AH / 1854 AD

Legacy and children
Tahawar Ali was married to Fahimun Nisan, daughter of Abdul Qayyum ibn Ghulam Nabi (from Dotana, a village in Peepaloo Tahsil in Tonk district in Rajasthan) and had four sons Abdur Razzak, Ibrahim Ali, Yusuf Ali and Yaqub Ali. Fahimun Nisan remained in Tijara after the death of Tahawar Ali even when all her sons left for Bhopal. She died on 10 Muharram 1301 AH / 1883 AD.
 Abdur Razzak (born 4 Rajab 1254 AH / 1838 AD) went to Bhopal at the age of 22 years on the invitation of his maternal cousin Munshi Hakimuddin. In 1276 AH / 1859 AD, he joined the services as Assistant Collector Customs and Excise. While staying in Bhopal, he then invited all his three brothers. Abdur Razzak was married to Qadeerun Nisan, daughter of Rahimuddin ibn Shamsuddin. Rahimuddin was Qazi of Ginnor, District Rohtak. He had only one daughter Mahmooda Begum alias Masiti Begum (married to Hafiz Mazhar Husain. Abdur Razzak in 1305 AH / 1887 AD built a home "Dewan Khana" near Masjid Qaziwara at Tijara.
 Ibrahim Ali (born 12 Rajab 1263 AH / 1846 AD) was married to Razzaqi Begum, daughter of Iradat Ali ibn Syed Rustam Ali of Pinangwan. He had five daughters Aulia Begum, Aala Begum, Kulsoom Begum, Asghari Begum and Fayyazi Begum and one son Abdul Baqi. Iradat Ali with his father-in-law got hanged during 1857 revolt. Aulia Begum was married to Khan Bahadur Syed Misbahul Usman ibn Syed Afzal Ali and had three daughters Alia Begum, Tahira Begum and Saira Begum and three sons Dr Hasan Afzal, Akhtar Afzal and Mustahsin Afzal. Aala Begum was married to Syed Ali ibn Ummeed Ali ibn Syed Rustam Ali and had five daughters Ummatul Azeem, Akbari Begum, Soofia Khatoon, Zakia Khatoon, Zubaida Khatoon and one son Ahsan Ali. Kulsoom Begum was married to Syed Iqbal Hasan ibn Syed Afzal Ali and had only one son Aziz Ahsan. Asghari Begum was married to her cousin Jamil Ahmad (son of Uncle Yusuf Ali). Fayyazi Begum was married to her cousin Khalil Ahmad (son of Uncle Yusuf Ali). Abdul Baqi was married to his cousin Ummatul Habib aka Choti Bi, daughter of Hafiz Mazhar Husain and had one daughter Nafisa Begum.
 Yusuf Ali (born 2 Safar 1267 AH / 1850 AD) was first married to Sakina Begum (daughter of Mohammad Hidayatullah ibn Inayat Husain of Dotana Tonk in 1282 AH / 1865 AD and had three sons Hamid Ali, Jamil Ahmad and Khalil Ahmad and one daughter Hajira Begum aka Banni. After the death of Sakina Begum on 10 Dhu al-Hijjah 1298 AH / 1880 AD, Yusuf Ali remarried to Sakina Begum (same name as of first wife), daughter of Barkat Ali Haqqi ibn Khairat Ali of Palwal. Hamid Ali had no children. Jamil Ahmad had one son Hasan Ahmad who was an active member of Khaksars Tehrik during the British rule and died with other members of Khaksars during the police firing near Jamia Masjid. Khalil Ahmad had five daughters Anwari Begum, Sultan Begum, Hasib Fatima, Habib Fatima, Razia Khatoon and two sons Jalil Ahmad and Habib Ahmad
 Yaqub Ali (born 6 Rabi' al-awwal 1269 AH / 1852 AD) was married to Saeedun Nisan (21 Muharram 1272 AH / 1855 AD – 13 Rabi' al-thani 1335 AH / 1916), daughter of Qazi Ghulam Muhiuddin. Yaqub Ali was Thanedaar (Police Station Master) at the main Bhopal Thana. He was assassinated by a thief with Combat knife on 11 Rabi' al-thani 1309 AH / 1891 AD at the age of 40 years. His son Zahiruddin died at the age of 28 years on 18 Dhu al-Qi'dah 1329 AH / 10 November 1911 (Friday). His wife Saeedun Nisan performed Hajj in 1331 AH/ 1912 AD and died at the age of 63 years. After her husband's death, she received scholarship (wazifa) from the Bhopal state.

See also
Qazi Syed Inayatullah
Qazi Syed Hayatullah
Munshi Hakimuddin
Hafiz Mazhar Husain
Syed Afzal Ali

References

People from Nagpur
People from Tijara
People from Bhopal
Indian Muslims
1854 deaths
Year of birth unknown